The reported bombing of Katyr-Yurt (Chechnya) occurred on February 4, 2000, when Russian forces bombed the village of Katyr-Yurt and afterwards a refugee convoy under white flags. The village was also previously bombed by the Russians in 1995 and in 1996.

Events

Journalists who managed to report on the area confirmed the use, by the Russians, of the vacuum bomb on the town. Vacuum bombs are dropped by parachute, and, when a couple of meters from the ground, release a cloud of petrol gas. The gas then reacts with the air, causing an explosion and then a vacuum, sucking away oxygen from living people, thus killing them.

The residents, including many civilian refugees who had fled the fighting Grozny, were not warned in advance or told of safe exit routes by the Russian side. The sudden heavy bombardment of the village began in the early hours of the morning and subsided at approximately 3 p.m. At that time, many of the villagers attempted to leave, believing that the military had granted a safe passage out of the village. As they were leaving by road, planes appeared and bombed the cars.

The final atrocity came in the afternoon of February 4. The Russians told the Chechens they would be able to leave in a convoy of buses with white flags attached. The convoy which the Russians themselves dispatched for the Chechens was then bombed by the Russians.

A resident of the village claimed that Chechen fighters entered the village on the 5th of February.

Ultimately, the bombing lasted for two days and resulted in the deaths of at least 363 civilians, all of them formally citizens of Soviet Union. Many more were injured.

European Court of Human Rights judgments

In the February 24, 2005 ruling, the European Court of Human Rights held Russia responsible for the civilian deaths in Katyr-Yurt:

In 2010, the court delivered a judgement in another case related to Katyr-Yurt events: Abuyeva and Others v. Russia.

Judgment in the third case related to the bombing was adopted by European Court of Human Rights in 2015.

See also
Grozny ballistic missile attack, another attack that resulted in massive civilian losses.
Russian war crimes

References

External links
European Court Hears Chechens' Lawsuits, Associated Press, October 15, 2004
European Court Rules Against Moscow, Institute for War and Peace Reporting, March 2, 2005
War Crimes and Human Rights Violations in Chechnya (Memorial)

Attacks in Russia in 2000
Mass murder in 2000
Conflicts in 2000
Article 13 of the European Convention on Human Rights
Article 2 of the European Convention on Human Rights
European Court of Human Rights cases involving Russia
2000 in Russia
Massacres in Russia
War crimes of the Second Chechen War
Mass murder in Russia
February 2000 events in Russia
2000 in Chechnya
Airstrikes conducted by Russia